Ján Repák (18 February 1956 – 12 May 2021) was a Slovak volleyball player. He competed in the men's tournament at the 1980 Summer Olympics.

References

External links
 

1956 births
2021 deaths
Slovak men's volleyball players
Olympic volleyball players of Czechoslovakia
Volleyball players at the 1980 Summer Olympics
People from Čadca District
Sportspeople from the Žilina Region